A list of American films released in 1926.

A

B

C

D

E

F

G

H

I

J

K

L

M

N

O

P

Q

R

S

T

U

V

W

Y

Shorts

See also
 1926 in American television
 1926 in the United States

References

External links

1926 films at the Internet Movie Database

1926
Lists of 1926 films by country or language
Films
1920s in American cinema